Venkanna refers to Lord Venkateswara.

Venkanna is one of the Indian personal names:

 Balakrishna Venkanna Naik, famous Member of Indian Parliament.
 Gorantla Venkanna was a well-known philanthropist, lover and patron of Sanskrit language.
 Goreti Venkanna is a popular Indian poet and folk singer.
 Venkanna Chetty was a head teacher of schools in the Fiji Islands.
 Venkanna H. Naik was a Commissioner of Bijapur District, India.

Masculine given names